Lecomtedoxa is a genus of plant in family Sapotaceae described as a genus in 1914.

Lecomtedoxa is native to tropical west-central Africa (Gabon, Cameroon, Republic of the Congo).

Species
 Lecomtedoxa biraudii – Republic of the Congo, Gabon
 Lecomtedoxa heitzana – Gabon
 Lecomtedoxa klaineana – Cameroon, Gabon
 Lecomtedoxa nogo – Gabon
 Lecomtedoxa plumosa – Cameroon
 Lecomtedoxa saint-aubinii – Gabon

References

 
Flora of Africa
Sapotaceae genera
Taxonomy articles created by Polbot